Leaving Time is a 2014 novel by American writer Jodi Picoult. It is the twenty-third novel written by the author. The first edition was published on October 14, 2014, by Ballantine Books, an imprint of Random House.

Plot summary
After ten years of her mother going missing, Jenna sets out to find her mother with a retired detective and psychic.

This story follows 13-year-old Jenna Metcalf who is determined to find her mother, who went missing 10 years prior and was never found.

When Jenna was three, her mother, Alice, was in an accident at an Elephant sanctuary in New Hampshire, where Jenna's parents and another family worked. The accident resulted in another employee being found trampled to death and Alice with a head injury. That same night Alice checked herself out of the hospital and was never found again. Jenna's father and Alice's husband, Thomas Metcalf develops manic depression and is taken into the custody of a mental institution, so Jenna ends up with her grandma.

However, Jenna believes her mother is still alive. After Jenna's 13th birthday, she sets out to find help, when she meets a drained detective named Virgil, and Serenity, a psychic who had lost her ability to connect to the beyond. After some struggles and disagreements along the way, the trio sets out to find clues at the elephant sanctuary. At the scene of the accident, they find a pebble necklace.

In hopes to find more information, they go visit Thomas Metcalf, who reacts violently when seeing Jenna in the necklace. This makes Virgil believe that Thomas acted out because there was suspicion that Alice had been having an affair with another worker at the elephant sanctuary, Gideon. Jenna then starts tracking down Gideon, who she finds at another elephant sanctuary, but in Tennessee.

Gideon confesses that there was an affair between himself and Alice, and when his wife, who had also worked with them, Grace, found out, she committed suicide.

But that is not all- Alice is also expecting Gideon's baby. When Nevvie, Gideon's mother-in-law finds out that Gideon and Alice are going to run away with Jenna, Nevvie tells him he hopes that Gideon gets everything he deserves.

Disappointingly, now Jenna believes her mother is probably dead, so she asks Serenity to contact her, despite her struggles with connections, Serenity needs a strong presence, so they set out to a spot in the elephant sanctuary that had a special meaning for Alice. Despite her efforts, Serenity cannot see anything, but to give Jenna some form of closure, she fakes a vision. During this time, she also stumbles across a new piece of evidence- a tooth lodged in the dirt.

Virgil, Serenity, and Jenna take the tooth for DNA testing and get the results back stating that the tooth comes from a child under the age of five. Immediately, Jenna remembers what happened that night...

Three-year-old Jenna is led out to the sanctuary grounds, by her babysitter Nevvie, when revenge over her daughter's death overtakes her and she smashes Jenna over the head. When Alice arrives at the scene, it is too late for her daughter, but not for Nevvie. They fight and Alice blacks out after receiving a blow to the head. The next thing Alice remembers at the scene is her daughter's missing body, and Nevvie dead. Just as her mother's work had talked about, the elephants took their grief in stride; one of the elephants drags away Jenna's body and covers it with dirt. Alice flees back to Africa, in fear of being accused of murder.

This is when Jenna realizes she is actually dead, but caught in the middle of the world and spirit dimension.  Virgil also clues in that he is a ghost. When he had failed to solve Alice's disappearance the first time, he tried to commit suicide, but didn't know it worked. All these years Jenna and Virgil thought they were alive.  Both of them were able to move onto the spirit realm, after teaching Serenity that she hadn't lost her psychic gift.

In their memory, Serenity contacts the police to show them the tooth. Shortly after, Jenna's body is found nearby the scene of the accident, and the case is finally put to rest. Alice gets a call that her daughter's body had been found, so she returns to the US for the burial of Jenna. Alice finally gets closure when serenity contacts her, and claims that she had spoken to Jenna. At first, Alice is skeptical, however, Serenity is able to convince Alice that she is not crazy by telling her different trivial facts that were impossible to explain, as well as manifest Jenna's spirit into a mirror. Finally, everyone is able to move on.

Reception[edit] 
The Boston Globe notes, "Picoult does her homework, and her main themes are thoroughly researched and engrossingly presented. With this new novel, 'Leaving Time,' her fans will not be disappointed."   

Critics at The Globe and Mail also believe that "this is Picoult at the top of her game".

References 

2014 American novels
Novels by Jodi Picoult
Ballantine Books books